Nasserism is an Arab nationalist and Arab socialist political ideology based on the thinking of Gamal Abdel Nasser, one of the two principal leaders of the Egyptian Revolution of 1952, and Egypt's second President. Spanning the domestic and international spheres, it combines elements of Arab socialism, republicanism,  nationalism, anti-imperialism, developing world solidarity, Pan-Arabism, and international non-alignment.

Many other Arab countries have adopted Nasserist forms of government during the last century, most being formed during the 1960s, including Muammar Gaddafi's Socialist People's Libyan Arab Jamahiriya (1977–1986) and later the Great Socialist People's Libyan Arab Jamahiriya (1986–2011) after the 1986 United States bombing of Libya. The Nasserist ideology is also similar in theory to the Ba'athist ideology which was also notably practiced under Saddam Hussein's Ba'athist Iraq (1968–2003) and under Hafez al-Assad and now Bashar al-Assad's Syrian Arab Republic (1971–present).

History

In the 1950s and 1960s, Nasserism was amongst the most potent political ideologies in the Arab world. This was especially true following the Suez Crisis of 1956 (known in Egypt as the Tripartite Aggression), the political outcome of which was seen as a validation of Nasserism and a tremendous defeat for Western imperial powers. During the Cold War, its influence was also felt in other parts of Africa and the developing world, particularly with regard to anti-imperialism and non-alignment.

The scale of the Arab defeat in the Six-Day War of 1967 damaged the standing of Nasser and the ideology associated with him. Though it survived Nasser's death in 1970, certain important tenets of Nasserism were revised or abandoned totally by his successor Anwar Sadat during what he termed the Corrective Revolution and later his Infitah economic policies. Under the three decade rule of Sadat's successor Hosni Mubarak, most of the remaining Arab-socialist infrastructure of Egypt was replaced by neoliberal policies strongly at odds with Nasserist principles. In the international arena, Mubarak departed almost entirely from traditional Egyptian policy, becoming a steadfast ally of both the United States government and Israel, the latter still viewed by most Egyptians with enmity and distrust, derived largely from the five wars that Egypt fought against Israel between 1948 and 1973.

During Nasser's lifetime, Nasserist groups were encouraged and often supported financially by Egypt to the extent that many became seen as willing agents of the Egyptian government in its efforts to spread revolutionary nationalism in the Arab world. In the 1970s, as a younger generation of Arab revolutionaries came to the fore Nasserism outside Egypt metamorphosed into other Arab nationalist and pan-Arabist movements, including component groups of the Lebanese National Movement during the Lebanese Civil War.  The main Nasserite movements that continued to be active until today on the Lebanese scene are mainly represented by the organization in Sidon of populist Nasserist partisans (al-Tanzim al-Sha'bi al-Nassiri) that are led by Oussama Saad and in Beirut as represented mainly by the Al-Mourabitoun movement. Both groups have been mainly active since the early 1950s among Arabs and they are currently associated politically with the March 8 coalitions in Lebanese politics.

Nasserism continues to have significant resonance throughout the Arab world, and informs much of the public dialogue on politics in Egypt and the wider region. Prominent Nasserist Hamdeen Sabahi competed in the first round of the 2012 Egyptian presidential election and only narrowly avoided securing a position in the run-off against eventual winner Mohamed Morsi; he later competed in the 2014 presidential election as one of only two candidates in a run-off, but lost to the other candidate, Abdel Fattah el-Sisi, in a significant landslide victory for the latter.

Interpretations
"Nasserism", the broad term used in literature to describe the aspects of Nasser's rule and his legacy, can be interpreted in many ways. Granted that there is a multitude of ways in which the term is read and used, P. J. Vatikiotis in his book Nasser and his Generation (1978) argues that Nasserism had the limited political connotation of a phenomenon of "personal charismatic leadership, not to a movement or ideology". Vatikiotis elaborates upon Nasser's use of speech as a political tool to sway his constituents despite their deprivation of any participation in their leader's policies. To this end, Nasser frequently addressed masses on both radio and television as well as in huge rallies, with a "repeated hypnotic incantation of "imperialism" and "agents of imperialism", "reactionaries", "revenge", "dignity and self-respect", "Zionism" and "Arabism". Crowds were galvanized to hysteria as Nasser excited them with hopes and aspirations of strong leadership and Arab unity.

In Rethinking Nasserism (2004), Podeh and Winckler discuss another interpretation of Nasserism. According to them, "Western social scientists in the 1950s and 1960s, perceived Nasserism as a modernization movement and Nasser as a modernizing leader…Egypt was seen as a typical Third World country undergoing a process of decolonization and, under new revolutionary leadership, aspiring to national prosperity through modernization. Thus, Nasserism was perceived as an attempt to transform Egyptian traditional society through the modernization of its economy and society".

Yet another insight into Nasserism is provided in Political Trends in the Fertile Crescent (1958) by Walid Khalidi, who discusses it as not an ideological movement, rather an  "attitude of mind" that is "eclectic, empirical, radical, and yet conservative". According to Walidi, Nasserism was able to attract support in the Arab world because it "transferred, if only partially, to the Arab world itself, the center of decisions concerning the future of that world". Khalidi asserts that this change inspired self-confidence in the Arab community, which was particularly welcome after the recent shock over the loss of Palestine. In A History of the Modern Middle East (2018), the author also talks about how Nasserism inspired self-confidence in the Arab community. The author states, "Egypt had gained a measure of independence and pride that at that time seemed enviable and worthy of emulation."

Ideology
Nasserism is an Arab nationalist and pan-Arabist ideology, combined with a vaguely defined socialism, often distinguished from Eastern Bloc or Western thought by the label "Arab socialism". Though opposed ideologically to Western capitalism, Arab socialism also developed as a rejection of communism, which was seen as incompatible with Arab traditions and the religious underpinnings of Arab society. As a consequence, Nasserists from the 1950s to the 1980s sought to prevent the rise of communism in the Arab world and advocated harsh penalties for individuals and organizations identified as attempting to spread communism within the region.

Though mindful of the spiritual heritage of the Arab world, as with Ba'athism, Nasserism is largely a secular ideology. Just as with other manifestations of Arab nationalism, this led to direct conflict with ideologically Islamic-oriented political movements in the Arab world from the 1950s onward, particularly the Muslim Brotherhood. Nasserists espouse an end to Western interference in Arab affairs, developing world solidarity, international non-alignment, modernisation and industrialisation. Nasser himself was opposed vehemently to Western imperialism, sharing the commonly held Arab view that Zionism was an extension of European colonialism on Arab soil.

In world politics, Nasser's Egypt, along with Yugoslavia under Josip Broz Tito and India under Jawaharlal Nehru, was a major proponent of the Non-Aligned Movement, which advocated developing countries remaining outside the influence of the superpower blocs. However, notwithstanding this policy and government suppression of communist organisations within Egypt, Egypt's deteriorating relations with Western powers, particularly following the Tripartite Aggression of 1956, made Egypt heavily dependent on military and civil assistance from the USSR. The same was true for other revolutionary Arab governments, which although repressive of communism within Arab borders, entered into strong longstanding relationships with communist states outside the Arab world. The Egyptian-Soviet alliance continued well into the presidency of Nasser's successor as president, Anwar Sadat, especially with regard to the Arab–Israeli conflict.

Today
Nasserism remains a political force throughout the Arab world, but in a markedly different manner than in its heyday. Whereas in the 1950s and 1960s Nasserism existed as a revolutionary and dynamic movement with definite political and social goals, by the 1980s it had become a much less pronounced and distinct ideology. Today, many more Arabs are informed by Nasserism in a general sense than actually espouse its specific ideals and objectives. In terms of political organisations within Egypt itself and during the presidency of former Egyptian President Hosni Mubarak, Nasserism's scope was confined generally to writers, intellectuals and minor opposition parties. Nasserist movements were largely overshadowed by Islamic political organisations, especially the Muslim Brotherhood. This was a part of an overall trend within Egypt and the Arab world of Arab nationalism being overshadowed, and even eclipsed by political Islam. In Egypt, the Nasserist Party styles itself as the successor to Nasser and his Arab Socialist Union as does its offshoot, the Karama Party of Hamdeen Sabahi. However, as with all opposition parties in Egypt, their activities was severely limited by the Mubarak regime prior to the Egyptian revolution of 2011.

Whilst Nasser governed Egypt through a strictly authoritarian one-party system, with extreme limits on any form of political dissent, present-day Nasserists stress their support for democracy, explaining Nasser's autocratic excesses as necessary to implement his revolutionary policies.

Influence outside the Arab World

Despite being a quintessentially Arab ideology, Nasserism influenced to a degree left-wing movements in other parts of the developing world, particularly Sub-Saharan Africa and Latin America. Under Nasser, the Egyptian government gave support both moral and material to Sub-Saharan liberation movements fighting European imperialism. Nelson Mandela, the former South African President and Leader of the African National Congress, remarked that this support was crucial in helping sustain the morale of such movements, including in South Africa. Similar sentiments have been expressed by Fidel Castro, the former Cuban President, with regard to the Cuban Revolution and Cuba's later adversities with the United States Government. Both men stated that Egypt's resistance under Nasser against the joint British, French and Israeli invasion of Egypt in 1956 proved to be inspirational for their own movements.

Hugo Chávez, late President of Venezuela and leader of the self-styled Bolivarian Revolution, cited Nasserism as a direct influence on his own political thinking by stating: "Someone talked to me about his pessimism regarding the future of Arab nationalism. I told him that I was optimistic, because the ideas of Nasser are still alive. Nasser was one of the greatest people of Arab history. To say the least, I am a Nasserist, ever since I was a young soldier".

Left-wing British politician George Galloway has referred to Gamal Abdel Nasser as "one of the greatest men of the 20th century" and has called repeatedly for Arab governments to embrace the tenets of Nasserism in the 21st century.

See also
Arab nationalism
Arab socialism
Arab Struggle Party
Ba'athism
Egyptian revolution of 1952
Gamal Abdel Nasser
Pan-Arabism

Footnotes

References

 
20th century in Egypt
Anti-communism
Arab socialism
Eponymous political ideologies
Left-wing nationalism
Left-wing populism
Nationalism
Political ideologies
State ideologies
Syncretic political movements
Types of socialism